The Fraudulent Mediums Act 1951 was a law in England and Wales which prohibited a person from claiming to be a psychic, medium, or other spiritualist while attempting to deceive and to make money from the deception (other than solely for the purpose of entertainment). It repealed the Witchcraft Act 1735, and it was in turn repealed on 26 May 2008 by Schedule 4 of the Consumer Protection from Unfair Trading Regulations 2008 implementing the EU Unfair Commercial Practices Directive 2005 which targeted unfair sales and marketing practices. It also changed section four of The Vagrancy Act of 1824 to ensure that it is still enforced with the acts.

There were five prosecutions under this Act between 1980 and 1995, all resulting in conviction.

References

External links
Text of Fraudulent Mediums Act 1951

United Kingdom Acts of Parliament 1951
Witchcraft in England
Fraud legislation
Fraud in the United Kingdom
Repealed United Kingdom Acts of Parliament